Thiago Gomes Pacheco (born 12 May 1984) is a Brazilian football manager, currently in charge of São José-RS.

Career
Born in Porto Alegre, Rio Grande do Sul, Gomes started his career with Internacional, being a manager of their youth categories and an assistant of the B-team for six years. In 2011, he moved to Atlético Paranaense and worked as a scout and assistant manager.

In 2013, after a period in charge of São José-RS' under-20 squad, Gomes was named Osmar Loss' assistant at the under-20 team of Corinthians. He followed Loss to Bragantino in April 2015, but left the club after being sacked in July.

Gomes subsequently returned to São José just days after leaving Bragantino, being now appointed first team manager. However, he did not stay at the club after accepting an invitation from Paulo Roberto Falcão to work as his assistant at Sport Recife.

In April 2016, Gomes was named interim manager of Sport after Falcão was sacked. After the appointment of Oswaldo de Oliveira, he returned to his assistant role before leaving the club after the end of the year's Campeonato Pernambucano.

On 7 November 2016, Gomes was appointed manager of Fluminense's under-20 squad. He left in the following July to take over Pelotas.

In February 2018, Gomes left Pelotas to join Grêmio as manager of the under-23 team. On 15 April 2021, after the dismissal of Renato Gaúcho, he was named interim manager of the main squad.

Gomes returned to his previous role after the appointment of Tiago Nunes, but was again named interim on 5 July 2021 after Nunes was sacked. He was fired from the club in December.

On 7 June 2022, Gomes was appointed manager of Série C side Brasil de Pelotas. On 10 September, he returned to São José for the upcoming season.

References

External links
 

1984 births
Living people
Sportspeople from Porto Alegre
Brazilian football managers
Campeonato Brasileiro Série A managers
Campeonato Brasileiro Série C managers
Esporte Clube São José managers
Sport Club do Recife managers
Esporte Clube Pelotas managers
Grêmio Foot-Ball Porto Alegrense managers
Grêmio Esportivo Brasil managers